Rethika Srinivas is an Indian actress who has appeared in Tamil films.

Career
Rethika graduated with a degree in electronic engineering from SRM University, before pursuing a master's degree in media studies in the United Kingdom. She subsequently began her own media company, Ice Breakers, which helped conduct shows in Dubai, while also working as a model in several ad films. While auditioning for an advertisement with TVC, she met director Balaji Sakthivel who had been casting actresses for his next venture. Rethika was selected and won critical acclaim for her performance as an arrogant, young mother in the director's drama film Vazhakku Enn 18/9  (2012). After receiving further film offers, she took a sabbatical from her job as a brand consultant and concentrated on acting ventures.

She has since worked in films including Biriyani (2013) and Massu Engira Masilamani (2015)Balu Mahendra Kadhai Neram

Filmography

Films

Web series

Television 

 Chinna Maapley Periya Maapley (Teleserial paired with S.Ve.Sheker directed by T Dorairaj)
Kaattula Mazhai (TV adaptation of S Ve Sheker's stage drama of same name)
 Kathai Neram

References

External links

Living people
Actresses in Tamil cinema
Actresses from Chennai
Indian film actresses
21st-century Indian actresses
1973 births